NASCAR 2005: Chase for the Cup is the eighth installment of the EA Sports' NASCAR video game series. It was developed by EA Tiburon and released on August 31, 2004 for the PlayStation 2 and Xbox and on September 4 for the GameCube. NASCAR 2005 is the first game in the series to drop the word Thunder from the title since NASCAR 2001. Kevin Harvick, driver of the No. 29 GM Goodwrench Chevy Monte Carlo, appeared on the cover replacing Jeremy Mayfield who was originally to have been on the cover. It also marks the first time the original PlayStation has been excluded from the NASCAR lineup. This was the first NASCAR edition to be released exclusively on sixth generation home consoles.

Unlike previous entries, which would normally add a few extra features but leave most of the game identical to its predecessor, the game brought massive change to the series. One example is the inclusion of NASCAR series other than the NASCAR Cup Series; the Busch Series (renamed the National Series due to alcohol advertising regulations, though the series is still referred to in-game as the Busch Series by the player's agent and Bill Weber), the Craftsman Truck Series, and the Featherlite Modified Series, plus production cars and the Daytona Prototypes of the Rolex Sports Car Series. More examples include the implementation of NASCAR's new Chase for the Cup points system, and Fight to the Top mode, where the player controls a custom driver throughout his career starting in the lower series and working up the ladder (similar to NASCAR: Dirt to Daytona). Another change is the absence of the cockpit view and the absence of makes and models in the Truck series, all of which appear to be Ford F-150s. Also, due to failed negotiations with licensing, Pocono Raceway is not included. This was the last NASCAR game released for the GameCube. The score is composed by David Robidoux.

Gameplay

Lightning Challenges
Lightning Challenge mode includes challenges of moments that happened in NASCAR from 2003 and the 1st part of 2004. Michael Waltrip, driver of the No. 15 NAPA Chevrolet, returns as the commentator for all the challenges except for two, Kevin Harvick does the challenges that involve Waltrip being the driver in the challenge. These challenges are played on all difficulty levels. The player must beat a number of challenges at that difficulty level before going to the next difficulty level.

Career Mode
The player starts out with a street race in Dodge Vipers with Ryan Newman, who afterwards gives the player an offer for a one-year contract in a Modified car. Every car offer is rated between one and five stars, which is showing the quality of the car upgrades and pit crew. As the player gains prestige, they will receive better offers and in the other series, but when enough money has been saved up, the player can create their own team, hire drivers, buy upgrades and train their crew.

Reception

NASCAR 2005 received a runner-up position in GameSpot's 2004 "Best Driving Game" award category across all platforms, losing to Burnout 3: Takedown. IGN wrote, "Chase for the Cup will still appeal to casual and hardcore fans with its impressive production values, clean graphics, incredible audio, and finite conclusion."

Legacy

The maneuver resulted in Chastain being credited with the fastest lap during a NASCAR Cup Series race for Martinsville Speedway.

See also
 NASCAR SimRacing

References

2004 video games
Electronic Arts games
GameCube games
North America-exclusive video games
NASCAR video games
PlayStation 2 games
Xbox games
EA Sports games
Multiplayer and single-player video games
Video games developed in the United States